Idwal Foel (Idwal the Bald; died c. 942) or Idwal ab Anarawd (Idwal son of Anarawd) was a 10th-century King of Gwynedd in Wales. A member of the House of Aberffraw, he inherited the throne from his father, Anarawd ap Rhodri. William of Malmesbury credited him as "King of the Britons" in the manner of his father.

Life
Idwal inherited the throne of Gwynedd on the death of his father Anarawd around 916. He allied himself with Æthelstan of England upon the latter's accession in 924. As Æthelstan was eager to establish his authority across Britain, Idwal honoured him by visiting the English court in 927, 928, and 937. On the first of these visits, he signed charters agreeing to campaign with Æthelstan against the Scots, and marched with Hywel Dda of Deheubarth and Morgan ab Owain of Gwent against Owain ap Dyfnwal, King of Strathclyde that year. Owain was forced to submit to the English king and appear at court by Christmas.

Æthelstan died in 939 and was succeeded by his half-brother Edmund. In 942 Idwal, apparently fearing that the Saxons would support Hywel in usurping him, launched an attack on the Saxons in Wales along with his brother Elisedd. The Annales Cambriæ record his failure: "Idwal and his brother Elisedd are killed in battle against the Saxons". The throne of Gwynedd should have passed to Idwal's sons Iago and Ieuaf, but Hywel invaded and drove them from the kingdom. He reigned for eight years before they were able to return and reclaim their patrimony.

Children
 Meurig, whose grandson was Iago ab Idwal ap Meurig
 Iefan
 Iago
 Cynan
 Idwal, also called "Ieuaf" ("the younger") or "Idwal Fychan" ("little Idwal")
 Rhodri

References

940s deaths
Year of death uncertain
Year of birth unknown
10th-century Welsh monarchs
House of Aberffraw
Monarchs of Gwynedd
Welsh princes